Jewels 6th Ring was a mixed martial arts (MMA) event held by MMA promotion Jewels.

Background
The event featured the Rough stone grand prix tournament finals, in which Asami Kodera, Mika Nagano and Alexandra Sanchez became the first Jewels champions. On , Saori Ishioka and Sally Krumdiack along with two more fights were added to the event. Hisae Watanabe was expected to make her return to MMA in this event, but suffered a broken foot during training and was unable to participate.

Results

See also
 Jewels (mixed martial arts)
 2009 in Jewels

References

External links
Official results at Jewels 
Event results at Jewels official blog 
Event results at Sherdog
Event results at Fightergirls.com
Event results  at Bout Review 
Event results at God Bless the Ring 
Event results at kakutoh.com 
Event results at sportsnavi.com 

Jewels (mixed martial arts) events
2009 in mixed martial arts
Mixed martial arts in Japan
Sports competitions in Tokyo
2009 in Japanese sport